Ali Daei is an Iranian former professional association football forward who formerly held the record of the all-time men's international top goalscorer, with 109 goals in 149 appearances between 1993 and 2006. His achievement is listed in Guinness World Records. On 28 November 2003, in an Asian Cup qualifier in Tehran against Lebanon, he scored his 85th international goal, elevating him past Hungarian footballer Ferenc Puskás to take the lead of the all-time list of scorers in international matches.

Daei was called up to join the Iran national football team (also known as Team Melli) on 6 June 1993 in the 1993 ECO Cup tournament held in Tehran, where he made his debut in a match against Pakistan. His first international goal came in a 6–0 victory over Chinese Taipei on 25 June 1993 during qualification for the 1994 FIFA World Cup. On 1 March 2006, his final goal came in a 3–2 victory over Costa Rica in a friendly match. His final appearance for Iran was in the 2006 FIFA World Cup against Angola on 21 June 2006 in the group stage.

He scored eight international hat-tricks. On 10 June 1996, he scored his first international hat-trick, in an 8–0 win over Nepal at Azadi Stadium in Tehran. On 17 November 2004, he scored the last one against Laos in a 2006 FIFA World Cup Qualification match, giving him 102 goals and making him the first male player to score 100 goals in international football. 

He scored 36 goals in FIFA World Cup qualification matches, 23 goals in AFC Asian Cup qualification games and 9 goals in Asian Games, as well as 14 goals in AFC Asian Cup Finals. The remainder of his goals, 27, were scored in friendly matches. He scored eight goals against two opposition teams, the Maldives and Laos, his highest tally against any country. He scored 44 international goals at the Azadi Stadium, his most at a single ground.

International goals 
Scores and results list Iran's goal tally first.

Hat-tricks

Statistics
Source:

Footnotes

See also

 List of men's footballers with 50 or more international goals
 List of top international men's association football goal scorers by country
 List of hat-tricks
 List of footballers with 100 or more caps

References

External links
 Profile at national football teams
 Profile at Teammelli.com

Daei, Ali
Daei